Stary Sikiyaz (İśke Hikäyaź) is a rural locality (a village) in Yalgyz-Naratsky Selsoviet, Tatyshlinsky District, Bashkortostan, Russia. The population was 226 as of 2010. There are 4 streets.

Geography 
Stary Sikiyaz is located 25 km southwest of Verkhniye Tatyshly (the district's administrative centre) by road. Yalgyz-Narat and Asavdy are the nearest rural localities.

References 

Rural localities in Tatyshlinsky District